Orthofidonia exornata is a species of geometrid moth in the family Geometridae first described by Francis Walker in 1862. It is found in North America.

The MONA or Hodges number for Orthofidonia exornata is 6429.

References

Further reading

 

Boarmiini
Articles created by Qbugbot
Moths described in 1862